Paula Arana Montes (born 8 November 2001) is a Spanish footballer who plays as a forward for Athletic Club.

Club career
Arana started her career at Aurrera Vitoria.

International career
Arana was a member of the Spain under-17 squad that won the 2018 UEFA Women's Under-17 Championship in Lithuania and the 2018 FIFA U-17 Women's World Cup in Uruguay.

References

External links
 
 
 
 

2001 births
Living people
Footballers from Vitoria-Gasteiz
Spanish women's footballers
Women's association football forwards
Athletic Club Femenino B players
Athletic Club Femenino players
Segunda Federación (women) players
Primera División (women) players
Spain women's youth international footballers
21st-century Spanish women